is a Japanese manga artist and character designer. She debuted in 1999 with the short comic Sakura, Chiru and since has been known for her series Strobe Edge, Ao Haru Ride, and Love Me, Love Me Not.

Works

Series

Short stories

Anthologies

Non-anthology stories

Artbooks

Design credits

References

External links 

Year of birth missing (living people)
Living people
Manga artists from Tokyo
Women manga artists
People from Tokyo
Japanese female comics artists
Female comics writers
Japanese women writers